The 2000 season was the Kansas City Chiefs' 31st in the National Football League (NFL), their 41st overall and their second and final season under head coach Gunther Cunningham. They failed to improve on their 9–7 record from 1999 and finished the season 7–9, marked by a series of on and off-field struggles and incidents.

The beginning of the season was marked on a somber note, as 9 time Pro Bowl Linebacker, team captain, and fan favorite Derrick Thomas died during the offseason. He was paralyzed in a January 23 automobile accident. In the accident, he was speeding on an icy Kansas City interstate while not wearing a seat belt and was thrown from his vehicle. He died the morning of February 8 of a pulmonary embolism.

In the Week 10 game against the Oakland Raiders, Chiefs quarterback Elvis Grbac set a franchise record for passing yards in a single game with 504.

The Chiefs gave the San Diego Chargers their only victory of the season, losing to them on November 26, 16–17.

Offseason

NFL draft

Personnel

Staff

Roster

Schedule

Preseason

Regular season

Note: Intra-division opponents are in bold text.

Game summaries

Week 1: vs. Indianapolis Colts

Week 2: at Tennessee Titans

Week 3: vs. San Diego Chargers

Week 4: at Denver Broncos

Week 5: vs. Seattle Seahawks

Week 7: vs. Oakland Raiders

Week 8: vs. St. Louis Rams

Week 9: at Seattle Seahawks

Week 10: at Oakland Raiders

Quarterback Elvis Grbac threw for 504 yards, setting the franchise record for most passing yards in a game.

Week 11: at San Francisco 49ers

Week 12: vs. Buffalo Bills

Week 13: at San Diego Chargers

The loss dropped the Chiefs to 5–7. Additionally, this would be the only the game the Chargers would win all season. The Chiefs failed to score an offensive touchdown, with the team's only touchdown coming on a Marvcus Patton pick six in the third quarter.

Week 14: at New England Patriots

Week 15: vs. Carolina Panthers

Week 16: vs. Denver Broncos

Week 17: at Atlanta Falcons

Standings

References

https://web.archive.org/web/20010414020055/http://www.kcchiefs.com/snr/schedule.asp?SchedYear=2000

Kansas City Chiefs
Kansas City Chiefs seasons
Kansas